The 1966 Washington Senators season involved the Senators finishing 8th in the American League with a record of 71 wins and 88 losses.

Offseason 
 October 12, 1965: Woodie Held was traded by the Senators to the Baltimore Orioles for John Orsino.
 November 19, 1965: Don Zimmer was released by the Senators.
 November 29, 1965: Bob Saverine was drafted by the Senators from the Houston Astros in the 1965 rule 5 draft.

Regular season 
 Emmett Ashford, the first black umpire in Major League Baseball history made his debut at D.C. Stadium on April 9, 1966.

Opening Day starters 
Ed Brinkman
Doug Camilli
Joe Cunningham
Ken Hamlin
Frank Howard
Don Lock
Ken McMullen
Pete Richert
Fred Valentine

Season standings

Record vs. opponents

Notable transactions 
 April 5, 1966: Al Closter was purchased by the Senators from the Cleveland Indians.
 April 13, 1966: Diego Seguí was purchased by the Senators from the Kansas City Athletics.
 July 30, 1966: Diego Seguí was traded by the Senators to the Kansas City Athletics for Jim Duckworth.

Draft picks 
 June 7, 1966: Del Unser was drafted by the Senators in the 1st round (18th pick) of the secondary phase of the 1966 Major League Baseball Draft. Player signed June 28, 1966.

Roster

Player stats

Batting

Starters by position 
Note: Pos = Position; G = Games played; AB = At bats; H = Hits; Avg. = Batting average; HR = Home runs; RBI = Runs batted in

Other batters 
Note: G = Games played; AB = At bats; H = Hits; Avg. = Batting average; HR = Home runs; RBI = Runs batted in

Pitching

Starting pitchers 
Note: G = Games pitched; IP = Innings pitched; W = Wins; L = Losses; ERA = Earned run average; SO = Strikeouts

Other pitchers 
Note: G = Games pitched; IP = Innings pitched; W = Wins; L = Losses; ERA = Earned run average; SO = Strikeouts

Relief pitchers 
Note: G = Games pitched; W = Wins; L = Losses; SV = Saves; ERA = Earned run average; SO = Strikeouts

Farm system

Notes

References 
1966 Washington Senators team page at Baseball Reference
1966 Washington Senators team page at www.baseball-almanac.com

Texas Rangers seasons
Washington Senators season
Washington Senators